Torpedo Stadium may refer to one of the following stadia:

Torpedo Stadium (Kokshetau) in Kazakhstan
Eduard Streltsov Stadium (Torpedo Stadium), Moscow
Torpedo Stadium (Togliatti) in Russia
Torpedo Stadium (Vladimir) in Russia
Torpedo Stadium (Mahilyow) in Belarus
Torpedo Stadium (Minsk) in Belarus
Torpedo Stadium (Zhodino) in Belarus